Hans-Josef Klauck (born 1946) is a German-born theologian, religious historian, and Franciscan priest. He is Naomi Shenstone Donnelley Professor Emeritus of New Testament and Early Christian Literature at the University of Chicago Divinity School.

Life 
Klauck studied in Münster and Bonn (Germany) and received his Doctorate of Theology degree from the Ludwig Maximilian University of Munich, Germany in 1977. He completed his Habilitation (Dr. habil.) at the University of Munich, Germany in 1980. Klauck received an honorary doctorate from the University of Zurich in 2008. Professor Klauck was the 2003–04 president of the Studiorum Novi Testamenti Societas. Having taught at the University of Chicago between 2001-2016, Professor Klauk retired in the Summer of 2016 and became Emeritus faculty.

Professional career 
Hans-Josef Klauck is one of the most prolific New Testament scholars today, and has worked extensively on topics such as the parables of Jesus, Paul’s Corinthian correspondence, and the Johannine letters. He has also specialized in the religious and social history of the Greco-Roman world as a necessary background to New Testament studies.

Klauck is the editor of Herders Biblische Studien and Stuttgarter Biblische Studien; coeditor of Hermeneia, Evangelische-Katholische Kommentar zum Neuen Testament and Wissenschaftliche Untersuchungen zum Neuen Testament; New Testament area editor for the new edition of Die Religion in Geschichte und Gegenwart; and the main New Testament editor of "Encyclopedia of the Bible and Its Reception".

Selected works

Books
Klauck has authored over thirty books and over 250 articles. His most recent books include:

References

External links
 Hans-Josef Klauck's faculty page at the University of Chicago 

1946 births
Living people
American Roman Catholic priests
21st-century American historians
21st-century American male writers
Roman Catholic biblical scholars
New Testament scholars
Members of the European Academy of Sciences and Arts
University of Chicago Divinity School faculty
Ludwig Maximilian University of Munich alumni
American Friars Minor
American biblical scholars
American male non-fiction writers